Theatre Works is a theatre venue, presenter and producer of independent theatre in St Kilda, Melbourne. 

Theatre Works was founded as Theatreworks, a theatre company, in 1980 by a group of young graduates from the Victorian College of the Arts including Hannie Rayson, Caz Howard, Paul Davies and Peter Summerfield. In the mid-1980s, the theatre company moved to the former Christ Church Parish Hall in Acland Street, St Kilda and the hall was renovated as a 146-seat theatre. 

Its name was changed to Theatre Works in 2009. In recent years, Theatre Works has focussed on presenting and supporting independent theatre productions across a range of theatrical genres. 

The company is currently headed by Dianne Toulson, General Manager (2017-present).

Recent leadership has included Artistic Director's Bryce Ives (2018), John Sheedy (2016-17), and Daniel Clarke (2012-2015).

References

Theatres in Melbourne
Theatre in Melbourne
Companies based in Melbourne
Buildings and structures in the City of Port Phillip
St Kilda, Victoria
1980 establishments in Australia